Gardners’ is an international wholesalers of books, eBooks, music and film. They work with multi-channel retailers worldwide, both online and on the high street, to supply physical and digital products. They offer back to store or direct to consumer on their behalf through a consumer direct fulfilment service.

Gardners are based in a 350,000 square foot facility in Eastbourne in South East England. They offer access to over 500,000 products in stock for same day dispatch, as well as over 1.5 million eBooks available for instant fulfilment.

History
 The company was founded in 1986 by Alan Little. 
 In 2010, it opened Hive.co.uk, a direct retail store that shares profits with nominated independent UK book stores, from which it allows local pickup. 
 In 2020, it became the UK partners of Bookshop.org.

See also
List of book distributors

References

External links
 Gardners official website

Wholesalers of the United Kingdom
British literature
Companies based in East Sussex
Eastbourne
Book distributors